The Laranjinha River is a river of Paraná state situated in southern Brazil. It is a tributary of Jacaré River (Rio das Cinzas), which in turn feeds into Paranapanema River. Laranhinja runs mainly towards the north and is some 350 km long. The source of Laranjinha lies in the municipality of Ventania.

The river has one hydroelectric plant, in commercial operation since 2008.

See also
List of rivers of Paraná

References

Rivers of Paraná (state)